Irving Caesar (born Isidor Keiser, July 4, 1895 – December 18, 1996) was an American lyricist and theater composer who wrote lyrics for numerous song standards, including "Swanee", "Sometimes I'm Happy",  "Crazy Rhythm", and "Tea for Two", one of the most frequently recorded tunes ever written. In 1972, he was inducted into the Songwriters Hall of Fame.

Biography
Caesar, the son of Morris Keiser, a Romanian Jew, was born in New York City, United States. His older brother Arthur Caesar was a successful Hollywood screenwriter. The Caesar brothers spent their childhood and teen years in Yorkville, the same Manhattan neighborhood where the Marx Brothers were raised. Caesar knew the Marx Brothers during his childhood. He was educated at Chappaqua Mountain Institute in Chappaqua, New York.

In his career, Caesar collaborated with a wide variety of composers and songwriters, including Rudolf Friml, George Gershwin, Sigmund Romberg, Victor Herbert, Ted Koehler and Ray Henderson. Two of his best known numbers, I Want to Be Happy and Tea for Two, were written with Vincent Youmans for the 1925 musical No, No, Nanette. Another of his biggest hits, Animal Crackers in My Soup, was popularized by Shirley Temple in her 1935 film Curly Top. "Just a Gigolo", his 1929 adaptation of an Austrian song, was a hit for Louis Prima in the 1950s and again for David Lee Roth in the 1980s.

In the late 1930s, he and composer Gerald Marks wrote a famous series of children's songs focusing on safety. Caesar made hundreds of appearances in schools performing the "Sing a Song of Safety," "Sing a Song of Friendship" (a United Nations-inspired series focusing on world peace, racial tolerance and friendship) and "Songs of Health" collections.

Caesar served on the songwriters' performance-rights organization ASCAP board of directors from 1930 to 1946 and again from 1949 to 1966. He was a founder of the Songwriters Guild of America. He died, aged 101, in New York on December 18, 1996.

Broadway credits
Note: All productions are musicals unless otherwise stated.

La La Lucille (1919) - additional lyrics
Kissing Time (1920) - adaptation of an earlier version of this musical - co-lyricist
Pins and Needles (1922) - revue - co-lyricist
The Greenwich Village Follies of 1922 (1922) - revue - co-lyricist and co-bookwriter
The Greenwich Village Follies of 1923 (1923) - revue - co-lyricist
The Greenwich Village Follies of 1924 (1924) - revue - co-lyricist
Betty Lee (1924) - co-lyricist
No, No, Nanette (1925) - co-lyricist
Charlot Revue (1925) - revue - featured lyricist for "Gigolette" and "A Cup of Coffee, a Sandwich and You"
Sweetheart Time (1926) - co-lyricist
Ziegfeld's Revue "No Foolin'" (1926) - revue - co-lyricist
Betsy (1926) - co-bookwriter
Talk About Girls (1927) - lyricist
Yes, Yes, Yvette (1927) - story originator
Here's Howe (1928) - lyricist
Americana of 1928 (1928) - revue - co-lyricist
Polly (1929) - co-composer and co-lyricist
George White's Scandals of 1929 (1929) - revue - co-composer and co-lyricist
Ripples (1930) - co-lyricist
Nina Rosa (1930) - lyricist
The Wonder Bar (1931) - play - co-playwright/adaptor of the original German
George White's Scandals of 1931 (1931) - revue - co-bookwriter
George White's Music Hall Varieties of 1932 (1932) - revue - co-composer and lyricist
Melody (1933) - lyricist
Shady Lady (1933) - reviser
Continental Varieties (1934) - revue - dialogue-writer
The White Horse Inn (1936) - English-version lyricist
My Dear Public (1943) - co-composer, co-lyricist, and co-bookwriter

Post-retirement credits:

The American Dance Machine (1978) - dance revue - featured lyricist
Up in One (1979) - revue - featured songwriter
Big Deal (1986) - featured English-version lyricist for "Just a Gigolo"
Sally Marr...and her escorts (1994) - play - featured lyricist for "Tea for Two"

References

External links

New York Times obituary
 Irving Caesar recordings at the Discography of American Historical Recordings.

Jewish American songwriters
American lyricists
American people of Romanian-Jewish descent
American centenarians
Men centenarians
1895 births
1996 deaths
Townsend Harris High School alumni
People from Yorkville, Manhattan
People from Chappaqua, New York
20th-century American musicians
20th-century American Jews